The Dwars door de Vlaamse Ardennen is a cycling race held annually in the province of East Flanders, Belgium. It is part of the UCI Europe Tour in category 1.2.

Winners

References

External links

Cycle races in Belgium
UCI Europe Tour races
Recurring sporting events established in 2014
2014 establishments in Belgium